The women's 400 metres hurdles event at the 2007 Asian Athletics Championships was held in Amman, Jordan on July 27, 2007.

Results

References
Final results

2007 Asian Athletics Championships
400 metres hurdles at the Asian Athletics Championships
2007 in women's athletics